Inanam is a suburb and sub-district of Kota Kinabalu in Sabah, Malaysia. It is situated 10 kilometres from the city centre.

History 
OKK Majimbun Majangkin is known as one of the key player in Inanam development. During the World War II, Inanam is also the base where the Kinabalu Guerillas led by Albert Kwok actively operating to fight the Japanese.

Demography 
The town population consists of mainly the Dusun, and the Chinese who operate the shops. Of late however there is a large influx of immigrants both from the southern Philippines and Indonesia. Many of them are illegals and live in squatters. A considerable number of them however were controversially naturalised and relocated into low-cost housing settlements provided by the Malaysian government.

Accessibility 
Kota Kinabalu City (North) Bus Terminal is located in Inanam which become part of the BRT Kota Kinabalu.

Economy 
A substantial part of the sub-district near the town centre consists of a light industrial area. Towards the interior, traditional Dusun villages scatter the hill slopes, with fruit orchards and rubber smallholdings.

Education

Primary school

SK Tobobon
SK Ruminding
SK Poring-Poring
SK Pomotodon
SK Malawa
SK Kionsom Inanam
SK Inanam Laut
SK Gudon Menggatal
SK Bantayan
SK Babagon Toki
SJK (C) Yick Nam

Secondary school

SMK Tebobon
SMK Inanam
SMK (A) Inanam

References 

Populated places in Sabah
Kota Kinabalu